Chris Brann (born March 25, 1972) is an American electronic music producer and remixer. He was born in Atlanta, Georgia. Brann is known for his work under the monikers Wamdue Project and Ananda Project.

Career
Chris Brann's teamed up with DJ Deep C (Chris Clark) and Udoh (Chris Udoh) in 1994. The trio started producing tracks together under the name Wamdue Kids, releasing house music EPs on Kelli Hand Detroit label Acacia Records, starting with the "Wamdue Kids #1" 12 inch in 1995. The trio remained together until 2000, releasing tracks under the names Wam Kidz and Wambonix. Since then, Brann has worked alone as a producer, employing vocalists and instrumentalists according to his needs. Vocalists Gaelle Adisson and Terrance Downs, in particular, have been regular contributors to many of Brann's tracks.

While still affiliated with Clark and Udoh, Brann started producing tracks on his own, using a variety of names, the most prolific of which are Wamdue Project, Ananda Project and P'Taah. Brann has mentioned he finds house music too easy to create, and has experimented creating music with influences from many subgenres of electronic music, such as deep house, downtempo, techno and drum and bass.

Chris Brann is better known for the hit "King of My Castle", released in 1997 under the name Wamdue Project. Originally produced by Brann as a downtempo piece, it achieved worldwide fame thanks to a remix by Roy Malone in house form. "King of My Castle" sold two million copies worldwide and is reportedly the best-selling single ever for the Strictly Rhythm label, as well as topping the charts in the United Kingdom and peaking within the top ten of the charts in countries including Denmark, France and Germany in 1999. A follow-up Wamdue Project single, "Where Do We Go", hit number nine on the Hot Dance Music/Club Play chart in 1998. One more single ("You're The Reason") achieved success in Germany and the United Kingdom, in lower chart regions (No. 55) and (No. 39). A 2000 re-release of "King of My Castle", with new remixes, hit the top spot the following year.

Wamdue Project appeared on the initial nominations list for 'Best British Newcomer', at the 2000 Brit Awards, before embarrassed organisers were forced to withdraw the nomination on account of Brann's American nationality.

Discography

Albums
Chris Brann
1997 Deep Fall
2001 No Room For Form - Volume 01

Wamdue Project
1996 Resource Toolbook Volume One
1998 Program Yourself
1999 Best Of
1999 Compendium

Ananda Project
2000 Release
2001 Re-Release
2003 Morning Light
2005 Relight
2007 Fire Flower
2008 Night Blossom
2013 Beautiful Searching

Wamdue Kids
 All are collaborations with Deep C and Chris Udoh
1996 These Branching Moments
1996 Wamdue Works

P'Taah
1999 Compressed Light
2001 De'compressed
2003 Staring At The Sun
2011 Perfumed Silence

Singles
Chris Brann
1995 "Detroit vs. Atlanta"
1997 "Smuthullet EP"
1999 "No Room For Form"
2001 "So In Love EP"
2003 "No Room For Form EP"
2004 "Journey To The Centre"

Wamdue Project
1996 "Breakdown/In Love With You"
1996 "Get High On The Music"
1996 "The Deep EP"
1997 "King of My Castle", with Gaelle Adisson
1998 "Program Yourself EP"
1998 "Where Do We Go"
1998 "You're The Reason", with Victoria Frigerio
2000 "King Of My Castle (2000 Remixes)", with Gaelle Addison
2004 "Home Planet"
2006 "Forgiveness" ft. Jonathan Mendelsohn
2007 "Washes Over You", with Heather Johnson
2008 "King Of My Castle (2008 Mixes)"
2010 "Paths", with Jessica Tonder

The Ananda Project
1998 "Cascades Of Colour EP", with Gaelle Addison
1999 "Cascades Of Colour", with Gaelle Addison
1999 "Straight Magic"
2000 "Cascades Of Colour 2000", with Gaelle Addison
2000 "Glory Glory", with Terrance Downs
2001 "Bahia/Expand Your Mind"
2001 "Falling For You", with Terrance Downs
2002 "Breaking Down"
2002 "Justice, Mercy"
2003 "I Hear You Dreaming", with Heather Johnson and Terrance Downs
2003 "Can You Find The Heart", with Nicola Hitchcock
2004 "Big Boat/Cascades Of Colour (Remixes)", with Terrance Downs and Gaelle Adisson
2004 "ICU"
2004 "Kiss Kiss Kiss", with Heather Johnson and Terrance Downs
2004 "Rain Down/Breaking Down", with Heather Johnson
2005 "Shouldn't Have Left Me", with Terrance Shelton
2006 "Secrets", with Marta Gazman
2006 "Suite Dreams", with Lydia Rhodes
2007 "Into the Sunrise", with Terrance Downs
2007 "Fireworks/Universal Love", with Terrance Downs and Kai Martin
2007 "Let Love Fly", with Heather Johnson
2007 "Free Me/Space And Time", with Heidi Levo
2007 "Stalk You"
2008 "Where The Music Takes You/Stay As You Are", with Kai Martin

P'Taah
1999 "Compressed Light EP"
2000 "No One, No How, Never"
2000 "Remixes"
2002 "Staring At The Sun", with Sylvia Gordon
2003 "Become Who You Are/Nobody Knows"
2003 "The Oldest Story", with Terrance Downs
2011 "Perfumed Silence"

Wamdue Kids
 All are collaborations with Deep C and Chris Udoh
1995 "Higher EP"
1995 "Disaster EP"
1995 "I Will EP"
1995 "Deep Dreams EP"
1995 "This Is What I Live For"
1996 "Memory EP"
1996 "Memory and Forgetting"
1996 "Ohm"
1996 "Panic EP"
1996 "The Digital Rawhide EP"

Wambonix
 All are collaborations with Deep C and Chris Udoh
1997 "Wambonix EP"
1997 "When You're Alone"
1999 "Deep Down"

Wam Kidz
 All are collaborations with Deep C and Chris Udoh
1997 "In Love Again"
1999 "CB's Groove"
2000 "Maria"

Other
2017 "Conflagration" 

Other aliases
2000 "Psychic Driving", as Feral
2000 "Mars Is A Giant Flat For Rent", as P'tang
2000 "Past And Future", as Santal
2001 "Be With You", as Santal, with Titus Marshall
2002 "Delilah (Be Strong 4 Me)", as Delilah, with Heather Johnson
2002 "1-2-3 Miami", as Jackass & Mule, with Tommie Sunshine
2003 "Be Strong 4 Me 2003", as Delilah, with Heather Johnson

See also
List of number-one dance hits (United States)
List of artists who reached number one on the US Dance chart

References

External links

Chris Brann on Myspace
Ananda Project on Myspace
Wamdue Project on Myspace
Chris Brann 2013 Audio Interview at Soulinterviews.com - "Elastic Soul Music for the Future"

Remixers
Living people
Musicians from Atlanta
American techno musicians
American house musicians
Deep house musicians
1972 births
Peacefrog Records artists